Tunnel hole-through, also called breakthrough, is the time, during the construction of a tunnel built from both ends, when the ends meet, and the accuracy of the survey work becomes evident.  Many tunnels report breakthroughs with an error of only a few inches, for example:

 the 1858 Blue Ridge Tunnel – 
 the 1944 Blue Ridge Tunnel replacement –   - 1944
 the Lötschberg Base Tunnel – 10 cm
the Holland Tunnel - 1 cm

See also 
 Cascade Tunnel

References

External links 

  Gautrain tunnel breakthrough
  Brisbane Clem 7
  Gotthard tunnel
  Lotschberg - 10 cm

Tunnel construction